Ushkuyniks, also ushkuiniks, were medieval Novgorodian pirates who operated along the Volga River, the eastern part of Scandinavia, and north of the Ural mountains from the 12th to the 15th century. Some historians see them as a continuation of Viking traditions of ancient Rus' people.

Etymology
These ships could be easily transported over portages between watersheds.

The word  likely derives either from Oskuya river, or from Old Veps “*uškoi̯” (small boat).

History
Novgorodians took part in the Tsargrad expeditions of the 10th century and other raids on Byzantine Empire, mounted pillaging raids to Finland since 12th century (see Swedish–Novgorodian Wars),including seizing its capital – Turku. 

Ushkuyniks first appear in the historical record as an organized force in the 1320s. Arranged in squadrons which could number several thousand, Ushkuyniks enjoyed the patronage of influential boyar families of Novgorod, who used them to demonstrate Novgorod's military clout to its neighbours and to advance its trade interests and influence along the Volga river.

During the campaign of 1360, ushkuyniks sailed from Novgorod by the portages to the Volga river. Under command of boyar Anfal Nikitin, they gained possession of Zhukotin, a trade emporium in Volga Bulgaria. A ruler of the Golden Horde, which controlled Zhukotin, was furious and ordered Grand Prince Dmitry Konstantinovich to capture the ushkuyniks and to bring them to the Horde for trial, but Dmitry's punitive expedition failed.

In 1363 Ushkuyniks launched the first Novgorodian raid along the Ob River in western Siberia. At the same time, the chronicles describe Karelo-Novgoridian raids on Norwegian border provinces. 

Three years later, without consulting their superiors in Novgorod, they approached Nizhny Novgorod and, wishing to punish Dmitry for his hostile action, massacred Armenian and Tatar merchants trading there. This led to a diplomatic row, when Dmitry demanded apologies from Novgorod Republic.

In 1371 Ushkuyniks sacked Yaroslavl, Kostroma and other Upper Volga cities. Three years later they sailed with upwards of ninety ships to pillage the Vyatka region. In 1375, they defeated the militia of Kostroma and burnt the city to the ground. The destruction was so severe that Kostroma had to be rebuilt elsewhere. After that, they looted Nizhny Novgorod and sailed down the Volga to Astrakhan, where they were annihilated by a Tatar general.

By 1391 Ushkuyniks had recovered from this reverse and felt strong enough to resume their activities. In this period Patrikas, the overlord of the Korela district, was their patron. In 1391 the pirates sacked both Zhukotin and Kazan. With Muscovy's power on the ascendant, however, Novgorod Republic was pressed into putting down their filibustering activities in the first decades of the 15th century.

References

Further reading

14th century in Europe
Medieval pirates
Novgorod Republic
River and lake piracy
Russian pirates
Viking warriors